Halim Dener was a 16-year-old Kurdish boy shot dead by a German police officer in Hanover, on 30 June 1994. The Halim Dener Campaign commemorates the anniversary of his death.

Shooting 
Halim Dener was a 16-year-old Kurdish boy who had been tortured by the Turkish military. He fled Turkey before his village was destroyed and he was living in Hanover as an asylum seeker in 1994. On 30 June, he went out at night to put up posters for the National Liberation Front of Kurdistan (ERNK), an offshoot of the Kurdistan Workers' Party (PKK). The PKK had recently been banned in Germany as a terrorist group. Dener was in the central Steintor pedestrian zone when he encountered several police officers. According to the account of the police, what happened next was that he tried to run away and they restrained him. There was a scuffle and when a police officer tried to pick up his gun it fired, killing the boy.

Later events 

On the 20th anniversary of Dener's death in 2014, a proposal was made to rename a square after Dener, as a memorial. In the Linden-Limmer district, council members voted to do so, but the plan was then vetoed by the city council. The cancellation of the plan was controversial; one campaigner said "I don't think anyone would arrive at the idea that they wouldn't name a square after victims of fascism because that would upset neo-Nazis". The Halim Dener Campaign continued to press for a memorial to Dener in the city, but Mayor Stefan Schostok resisted, saying he did not want to enflame tensions between Turks and Kurds.

A mural painted to commemorate Dener in 1994 on a social centre in Bielefeld became subject to a three-year legal battle and was eventually declared in 2020 to be a work of art (and therefore not illegal). In 2021, 300 people marched in memory of Dener and to protest recent police raids on a Kurdish social centre.

See also 
 Killing of Rishi Chandrikasing

References

External links

 
 

1994 deaths
History of Hanover (city)
Kurdish independence activists
People shot dead by law enforcement officers in Germany